The year 2009 is the sixth year in the history of the Konfrontacja Sztuk Walki, a mixed martial arts promotion based in Poland. In 2009 Konfrontacja Sztuk Walki held 2 events beginning with, KSW 11: Khalidov vs. Acacio.

List of events

KSW 11: Khalidov vs. Acacio

KSW 11: Khalidov vs. Acacio was a mixed martial arts event held on May 15, 2009, at the Hala Torwar in Warsaw, Poland.

Results

KSW 12: Pudzianowski vs. Najman

KSW 12: Pudzianowski vs. Najman was a mixed martial arts event  held on December 11, 2009, at the Hala Torwar in Warsaw, Poland.

Results

See also 
 Konfrontacja Sztuk Walki

References

Konfrontacja Sztuk Walki events
2009 in mixed martial arts